"Money Don't Matter 2 Night" is a song by American musician Prince and the New Power Generation from their 1991 album, Diamonds and Pearls. Co-written with Rosie Gaines, the lyrics deal directly with money, poverty, and greed. Overall, the song is a smooth delivery with layered vocals by Prince.

The B-side is a previously unreleased track "Call the Law", with lead vocals by Tony M., supplemented by Rosie Gaines on the chorus. Prince provides guitar solos throughout the song. The track was added to the New Power Generation release Goldnigga in 1993. The UK 12-inch single and CD release also included the album track "Push".

Critical reception
Patrick Corcoran from Albumism said, "As lyrically scathing as anything he'd written to that point, it included the scarily prescient line "anything's better than a picture of a child in a cloud of gas"." He added, "Capturing the zeitgeist as Iraq was invaded for the first time, but also heartbreakingly, perpetually relevant to our times too, Prince's restrained delivery fits perfectly." Stephen Thomas Erlewine from AllMusic noted "the extraordinary Philly soul" of "the neglected masterpiece", viewing it as a "terrific" pop single. Mike Diver for the BBC stated in his 2010 review, that "there's no doubting Money Don't Matter 2 Night is the heart and soul of this album. A slow-paced strut, the track's a celebration of realising that hard cash isn't the be all and end all of one's existence". A reviewer from Cashbox noted, "The single is real mellow and more laid-back compared to most of his previous material. This cut should attract R&B, adult contemporary, pop and easy listening radio stations with ease. Mark down another hit." 

David Browne from Entertainment Weekly called it "one startling moment" from the album, that "is sung in a soulful growl that sounds utterly unaffected". He also added that it "sports a slinky, subtle groove that recalls the maturity of Stevie Wonder’s early-’70s heyday." A writer from the Gavin Report commented, "Strictly a lyrical record in which Prince speaks of the priceless and the invaluable as well as the here-today and the gone-tomorrow. An easy going, if not carefree musical treat." Simon Price from The Guardian picked the song as a "highlight" from the album, describing it as "thoughtfully mature". Another editor, Alexis Petridis said it is "a fantastic song, the smoothness of its sound and delivery masking a punchy, politically engaged lyric that takes in both consumerism and Operation Desert Storm." Pan-European magazine Music & Media wrote that after a ballad, "Diamonds And Pearls", "his royal badness speeds up the tempo just a little bit, for a nicely floating and immediately catchy number." Tom Doyle from Smash Hits stated that it is "the best song" on the LP, and "the best tune he's done for years." He added that here, Prince "gets into a laidback groove".

Chart performance
The song was an overall modest hit, reaching numbers 23 and 24 on the US Billboard Hot 100 and Hot 100 Airplay charts respectively, number 14 on the Hot R&B Singles chart, and number 27 on the Airplay chart. It also reached number 19 in the UK, number 18 in Australia, and number seven in the Netherlands.

Music videos
The song is notable for its promotional video, directed by Spike Lee. Featuring a poverty-stricken African-American family, with no shots of Prince, it was considered overly political and not "MTV friendly". A second version was issued, which included footage of the song performed by Prince and the New Power Generation, which was directed by Sotera Tschetter.

Charts

Release history

References

Prince (musician) songs
1991 songs
1992 singles
Music videos directed by Spike Lee
Paisley Park Records singles
Song recordings produced by Prince (musician)
Songs written by Prince (musician)
Warner Records singles